Bridger Mountain is a ridge in the U.S. state of West Virginia.

Bridger Mountain was named for pioneers James and John Bridger who were murdered by Indians near that point.

References

Ridges of Pocahontas County, West Virginia
Ridges of West Virginia